Michael William Thomas Jr. (born March 3, 1993) is an American football wide receiver for the New Orleans Saints of the National Football League (NFL). He played college football for Ohio State. Thomas holds the record for the most receptions by a player in a single season with 149 in 2019. He led the league in receptions in both the 2018 and 2019 seasons, while also leading the league in yardage in the 2019 season. He was the NFL Offensive Player of the Year in 2019.

Early years
Thomas attended Taft High School in Woodland Hills, California. As a senior, he had 86 receptions for a state-leading 1,656 yards and 21 touchdowns for the Toreadors football team. Thomas was ranked by Rivals.com as a four-star recruit. He committed to Ohio State University to play college football. Thomas attended Fork Union Military Academy for a year after high school and was roommates with fellow Ohio State teammate Cardale Jones.

College career

Thomas played in 11 games as a true freshman in 2012. He had three receptions for 22 yards in the 2012 season. As a sophomore in 2013, Thomas was redshirted.

Thomas entered his redshirt sophomore season in 2014 as a backup, but eventually took over as a starting wide receiver. He ended the season leading the team in receptions with 54 for 799 yards and nine touchdowns. In the National Semifinals against Alabama in the Sugar Bowl, he had seven receptions for 66 yards and a touchdown in the victory.

In the 2015 College Football Playoff National Championship victory over Oregon, he had four receptions for 53 yards. In the 2015 season, he had 56 receptions for 781 receiving yards and nine receiving touchdowns. On January 5, 2016, he announced his intention to enter the 2016 NFL Draft.

College statistics

College awards and honors
 CFP national champion (2014)
 Fiesta Bowl champion (2015)
 Sugar Bowl champion (2014)
 Big Ten champion (2014)
 Third-team All-Big Ten (2015)
 Big Ten All-Honorable Mention (2014)

Professional career

Thomas was drafted by the New Orleans Saints in the second round with the 47th overall pick in the 2016 NFL Draft. He was the sixth wide receiver to be selected that year.

2016 season

On May 9, 2016, the Saints signed Thomas to a four-year, $5.11 million contract with $2.60 million guaranteed and a signing bonus of $1.92 million.

The Saints named Thomas one of their starting wide receivers, along with Brandin Cooks, for the season opener against the Oakland Raiders. He finished his first NFL start with six receptions for 58 yards. On September 26, 2016, he caught his first NFL touchdown on a three-yard pass from Drew Brees during the second quarter of a Monday Night Football matchup against the Atlanta Falcons. Thomas finished the 45–32 loss with seven catches for 71 yards and a touchdown. On October 23, 2016, he had his first game with over 100 receiving yards after he finished with a season-high ten receptions for 130 yards in a 21–27 loss to the Kansas City Chiefs. During a Week 9 road game against the San Francisco 49ers, Thomas caught two touchdowns and made five catches for 73 yards, as the Saints routed the 49ers by a score of 41–23. On November 27, Thomas caught nine passes for 108 yards and tied his season-high of two touchdown receptions in a 49–21 win over the Los Angeles Rams. In the regular season finale against the Falcons, he had 10 receptions for 156 yards and a touchdown in the 38–32 loss. During his rookie season, Thomas set franchise records for a rookie in receptions, receiving yards, and touchdowns.

2017 season

In his second season, Thomas came into the year as the Saints' number one receiver after Brandin Cooks was traded to the New England Patriots. He was named to his first Pro Bowl. He finished the season with 104 receptions for 1,245 yards and five touchdowns. His 104 receptions finished third in the NFL, and his 196 receptions in his first two seasons in the league were the most in NFL history, passing Jarvis Landry's 194 set in 2015. Thomas appeared in his first career playoff game on January 7, 2018, against division rival Carolina in the Wild Card Round. He recorded eight receptions for 131 yards in the 31–26 win. In the Divisional Round against the Minnesota Vikings, he had seven receptions for 85 yards and two touchdowns in the 29–24 loss. He earned a Pro Bowl nomination for his 2017 season. Thomas was ranked 81st by his fellow players on the NFL Top 100 Players of 2018.

2018 season

In the season-opener against the Tampa Bay Buccaneers, Thomas caught a franchise-record 16 passes for 180 yards and a touchdown, breaking the century-mark for the fourth time in his career and eclipsing 200-career receptions. The 16 receptions were the most by any player for the 2018 season for a single game. The next week, he scored twice more with 89 yards on 12 catches in a 21–18 win over the Cleveland Browns. With his 12 receptions, Thomas set an NFL record for the most catches in the first two games with 28, the record previously held by Andre Rison with 26 set in 1994. In Week 3, he added 10 receptions for 129 yards against the Atlanta Falcons. His 38 receptions through the first three games were the most in NFL history.

In Week 9 against the Los Angeles Rams, Thomas had 12 catches for a franchise-record 211 yards, including a 72-yard touchdown. Upon scoring, Thomas paid tribute to former Saints wide receiver Joe Horn by recreating his famous cell phone touchdown celebration, which drew a 15-yard unsportsmanlike conduct penalty. Horn said he "teared up" at the gesture and bought Thomas' jersey. This Week 9 performance earned Thomas NFC Offensive Player of the Week.

In Week 13 against the Dallas Cowboys, Thomas recorded his 90th catch of the season, joining Odell Beckham Jr. as the only players in NFL history to record at least 90 receptions in their first three seasons.

Thomas finished the season with 125 receptions for 1,405 yards and nine touchdowns. He led the league in receptions and finished sixth in the league in receiving yards. He also set the Saints franchise record in receiving yards, passing Joe Horn's 1,399 yards set in 2004. He was named to his second straight Pro Bowl and was named first-team All-Pro. He was ranked 13th by his fellow players on the NFL Top 100 Players of 2019.

2019 season

On July 31, 2019, Thomas signed a five-year, $100 million contract extension with $61 million guaranteed with the Saints. This made Thomas the highest paid wide receiver in the NFL at the time.

During the season-opener against the Houston Texans on Monday Night Football, Thomas caught 10 passes for 123 yards in the narrow 30–28 victory. Two weeks later against the Seattle Seahawks, Thomas caught five passes for 54 yards and his first touchdown of the season in the 33–27 road victory. During Week 5 against the Tampa Bay Buccaneers, he caught 11 passes for 182 yards and two touchdowns as the Saints won 31–24. During Week 7 against the Chicago Bears, Thomas caught nine passes for 131 yards in the 36–25 road victory. In the next game against the Arizona Cardinals, he caught 11 passes for 112 yards and a touchdown in the 31–9 victory. During Week 10 against the Atlanta Falcons, Thomas finished with a season-high 13 catches for 152 yards as the Saints lost 26–9. During Week 11 against the Buccaneers, he caught eight passes for 114 yards and a touchdown in the 34–17 win. Thomas was named the NFC Offensive Player of the Month for his play in November. In Week 14 against the San Francisco 49ers, Thomas caught 11 passes for 134 yards and a touchdown in the 48–46 loss. During the game, Thomas set a new Saints' record for receiving yards in a single season. In the next game against the Indianapolis Colts on Monday Night Football, Thomas caught 12 passes for 128 yards and a touchdown during the 34–7 win. In Week 16 against the Tennessee Titans, he broke the single-season receptions record formerly held by Marvin Harrison with his 144th catch of the season, followed by a one-yard touchdown catch for his 145th, while the Saints won on the road by a score of 38–28.

Thomas finished the season with an NFL record 149 catches for 1,725 yards and nine touchdowns. In the NFC Wild Card Round against the Minnesota Vikings, Thomas caught seven passes for 70 yards during the 26–20 overtime loss. Thomas was named to the Pro Bowl and earned First Team All-Pro honors. On February 1, 2020, Thomas was awarded AP Offensive Player of the Year for his performance during the 2019 season, becoming the first wide receiver to win the award since Jerry Rice in 1993. He was ranked fifth by his fellow players on the NFL Top 100 Players of 2020.

2020 season
In Week 1 against the Tampa Bay Buccaneers, Thomas recorded three catches for 17 yards before exiting the game due to a high ankle sprain. Thomas was set to return to action in Week 5 against the Los Angeles Chargers on Monday Night Football, but on October 11, 2020, Thomas was declared inactive for the game by the Saints after he punched teammate C. J. Gardner-Johnson in practice. Thomas was also fined $58,823 by the team for the incident.

Thomas made his return from injury in Week 9 against the Tampa Bay Buccaneers on Sunday Night Football.  During the game, Thomas led the team with five catches for 51 yards during the 38–3 win. In Week 11 against the Atlanta Falcons, Thomas recorded nine catches for 104 yards during the 24–9 win.  This was Thomas' first 100-yard receiving game of the season. He was placed on injured reserve on December 19, 2020, due to the lingering ankle injury. He was activated on January 9, 2021.

In the Wild Card Round against the Chicago Bears, Thomas recorded five catches for 73 yards and his first touchdown reception of the season during the 21–9 win. He was ranked 72nd by his fellow players on the NFL Top 100 Players of 2021.

2021 season
On July 23, it was revealed that Thomas had undergone ankle surgery in the past month. He was placed on the PUP list three days later. On November 3, it was announced Thomas would not return during the 2021 season due to a setback with his ankle injury.

2022 season
Thomas returned from his injury in Week 1 against the Atlanta Falcons, where he caught five passes for 57 yards, and two touchdowns in the 27-26 comeback win. Thomas recorded another productive game in Week 2 with six out of nine receptions for 65 yards and a touchdown in a 20-10 loss to the Buccaneers. During a Week 3 matchup against the Carolina Panthers, Thomas exited the game early with a foot injury and went on to miss multiple weeks before being placed on injured reserve on November 3, 2022, ending his season.

NFL career statistics

NFL records
 Most receptions by a player through first game of a season: 16 (2018)
 Most receptions by a player through first two games of a season: 28 (2018)
 Most receptions by a player through first three games of a season: 38 (2018)
 Most receptions by a player through first four games of a season: 42 (2018)
 Most receptions by a player through first nine games of a season: 86 (2019)
 Most receptions by a player through first ten games of a season: 94 (2019)
 Most receptions by a player through first eleven games of a season: 104 (2019)
 Most receptions by a player through first twelve games of a season: 110 (2019)
 Most receptions by a player through first thirteen games of a season: 121 (2019)
 Most receptions by a player through first fourteen games of a season: 133 (2019)
 Most receptions by a player through first fifteen games of a season: 145 (2019)
 Most receptions by a player through first sixteen games of a season: 149 (2019)
 Most receptions by a player through his first two seasons: 196
 Most receptions by a player through his first three seasons: 321
 Most receptions by a player through his first four seasons: 470
 Most receptions by a player through his first five  seasons: 510
 Most receptions by a player in a single season: 149
 Most receptions by a player in a single season including playoffs: 156
 Most consecutive games with 4+ receptions: 43
 Most consecutive games with 11+ receptions: 3
 Most consecutive games with 12+ receptions: 2
 Most receiving yards by a player through his first four seasons: 5,512 (2016-2019)
 Most seasons, 120+ pass receptions: 2 (2018-2019) (tied with 2 others)
 Most seasons, 125+ pass receptions: 2 (2018-2019) (tied with 1 other)
 Fewest games to record 300 career receptions: 45 (2016-2018) (tied with one other)
 Fewest games to record 400 career receptions: 56 (2016-2019)
Fewest games to record 500 career receptions: 69 (2016-2020)

Saints franchise records
 Most receptions in a game: 16 (September 9, 2018, vs Tampa Bay Buccaneers)
 Most receiving yards in a game: 211 (November 4, 2018, vs Los Angeles Rams)
 Most receptions in a season by a rookie: 92 (2016)
 Most receiving yards in a season by a rookie: 1,137 (2016)
 Most receiving touchdowns in a season by a rookie: 9 (2016)
 Most receptions in a season: 149 (2019)
 Most receiving yards in a season: 1,725 (2019)

Personal life
Thomas is the nephew of former NFL wide receiver Keyshawn Johnson.

Thomas is a Christian.

References

External links
 
 Ohio State Buckeyes profile
 New Orleans Saints profile

1993 births
Living people
American football wide receivers
National Conference Pro Bowl players
New Orleans Saints players
Ohio State Buckeyes football players
Players of American football from Los Angeles
William Howard Taft Charter High School alumni
National Football League Offensive Player of the Year Award winners